Delobel is a surname. Notable people with the surname include:

Jean Delobel (1933–2013), French politician
Isabelle Delobel (born 1978), French ice dancer
Nicolas Delobel (1693–1763), French painter
Véronique Delobel (born 1978), French ice dancer, twin sister of Isabelle